Cerithiopsis tubercularis is a species of sea snail, a gastropod in the family Cerithiopsidae, It was described by Montagu, in 1803.

Distribution
This species is known from the northeastern Atlantic Ocean, the Azores, Cape Verde and European waters, including the Mediterranean Sea.

References

 Backeljau, T. (1986). Lijst van de recente mariene mollusken van België [List of the recent marine molluscs of Belgium]. Koninklijk Belgisch Instituut voor Natuurwetenschappen: Brussels, Belgium. 106 pp. 
 Gofas, S.; Le Renard, J.; Bouchet, P. (2001). Mollusca, in: Costello, M.J. et al. (Ed.) (2001). European register of marine species: a check-list of the marine species in Europe and a bibliography of guides to their identification. Collection Patrimoines Naturels, 50: pp. 180–213 (
 Muller, Y. (2004). Faune et flore du littoral du Nord, du Pas-de-Calais et de la Belgique: inventaire. [Coastal fauna and flora of the Nord, Pas-de-Calais and Belgium: inventory]. Commission Régionale de Biologie Région Nord Pas-de-Calais: France. 307 pp.
 Rolán E., 2005. Malacological Fauna From The Cape Verde Archipelago. Part 1, Polyplacophora and Gastropoda.
 Prkic J. & Mariottini P., 2010. Description of two new Cerithiopsis from the Croatian coast, with comments on the Cerithiopsis tubercularis complex (Gastropoda: Cerithiopsidae). Aldrovandia 5: 3-27 [stated date: 2009] [
 Cecalupo A. & Robba E. (2010) The identity of Murex tubercularis Montagu, 1803 and description of one new genus and two new species of the Cerithiopsidae (Gastropoda: Triphoroidea). Bollettino Malacologico 46: 45-64.

tubercularis
Gastropods described in 1803
Molluscs of the Atlantic Ocean
Molluscs of the Mediterranean Sea
Molluscs of the Azores
Gastropods of Cape Verde
Invertebrates of the North Sea
Taxa named by George Montagu (naturalist)